Synnøve Solbakken (born 11 May 1957) is a Norwegian politician for the Labour Party.

She served as a deputy representative to the Parliament of Norway from Hordaland during the term 2005–2009. She also served as mayor of Kvinnherad from 2007 to 2015.

References

1957 births
Living people
Labour Party (Norway) politicians
Deputy members of the Storting
Mayors of places in Hordaland
Women mayors of places in Norway
20th-century Norwegian women politicians
20th-century Norwegian politicians
Women members of the Storting